Rubeae is a tribe of the rose family, Rosaceae.

It contains the genus Rubus.

References

External links  

 
Rosales tribes